Maxine Syjuco (born December 1, 1984) is an artist, poet and model from Manila, Philippines. She is the youngest daughter of avant-garde artists Cesare Syjuco and Jean Marie Syjuco, and is the vocalist and songwriter of the experimental Art Rock band Jack of None.

Working mainly with photography, digital collage, painting and installation art, her work possesses an intimate, philosophical, and often twisted voice in storytelling. Manipulating faces, unveiling poignant surrealities, and probing into abandoned rooms of the subconscious, Maxine authors dark, thought-provoking introspections of the human condition and its fragility—conjuring a netherworld where ghostly images exist neither here nor there.

Her first book of poetry, "A Secret Life," was published in 2008 and received critical acclaim. Her poems have been translated into Polish and French, and have seen print in several international anthologies including the Asia Literary Review, The Poet’s Guild Quarterly, Chopin with Cherries, and the 2011 Rhino International Poetry Anthology.

In 2016, she was awarded the Independent Music Award in New York City, U.S.A., for Best Album Art, Photography and Design. In the same competition, her band, Jack of None, received 2 category nominations (Best Spoken Word Song, and Best Album of the Year) for their debut album titled "Who's Listening to Van Gogh's Ear?".

Maxine's exhibits and poetry-performances have taken place in venues as varied as the Cultural Center of the Philippines, the Metropolitan Museum of Manila, the Tokiwa Museum of Japan, the Hangaram Museum of Korea, the Art Takes Miami Exhibition in the U.S.A., and others.

References

21st-century Filipino poets
Filipino artists
Avant-garde art
People from Manila
Artists from Metro Manila
Writers from Metro Manila
Living people
1984 births
Filipino women artists
Filipino songwriters
Filipino women poets
21st-century Filipino artists
21st-century Filipino singers
21st-century Filipino women singers
21st-century Filipino women writers